WUHQ-LD, virtual and UHF digital channel 29, is a low-powered Daystar owned-and-operated television station licensed to Grand Rapids, Michigan, United States. The station is owned by the Word of God Fellowship.

History

WUHQ-LP signed on in May 2003 airing America's Store programming under the ownership of P & P Cable Holdings. It was well known in the Grand Rapids area for its "TV Mall" television series. The WUHQ call letters were previously used by channel 41 in Battle Creek (now WOTV, and ABC affiliate)—P & P Cable Holdings is known for picking up calls discarded by Michigan's radio and TV stations.

In 2005, WUHQ-LP added programming from UATV and the Mas Musica network to its schedule, becoming a bilingual (Spanish and English language) television station. The station aired videos of various Latin American music styles, including salsa/cumbia, regional Mexican, and contemporary Spanish-language hits. On September 25, 2006, Mas Musica was revamped as the new MTV Tr3s network, which was created as a result of Viacom's acquisition of Mas Musica. WUHQ carried MTV Tr3s programming, in addition to some shows from the America One network.

In June 2006, Equity under the license name of "Marquette Broadcasting", acquired WUHQ-LP from P & P Cable Holdings. Equity owned two other stations in Michigan -- Marquette dual-Fox/MNTV affiliate WMQF (channel 19) and Detroit Univision affiliate WUDT-CA (channel 23). The sale closed in Fall 2006. In November 2006, there was reports of a substantial change in WUHQ's programming as a result.

On May 30, 2007, WUHQ-LP switched affiliations to LAT TV, as part of a new deal between LAT TV and Equity. The LAT TV affiliation was dropped in late 2007, in favor of Equity's new music video network Retro Jams. The LAT TV network was later folded in May 2008. WUHQ would later be briefly affiliated with the Retro Television Network, before a contract dispute between Equity and RTN led to WUHQ's reaffiliation with Retro Jams.

WUHQ-LP was sold at auction to the Daystar Television Network on April 16, 2009. The station has since switched to digital operations on channel 29.

References

External links 
Michiguide: More info on P&P's WUHQ
Michiguide: More info on P&P Cable Holdings

Equity Media Holdings
UHQ-LD
Television channels and stations established in 2003
2003 establishments in Michigan
Low-power television stations in the United States
Daystar (TV network) affiliates